Novy Kurlak is a rural locality (a selo) and the administrative center of Novokurlakskoye Rural Settlement, Anninsky District, Voronezh Oblast, Russia. The population was 585 as of 2010. There are 6 streets.

Geography 
Novy Kurlak is located 19 km southeast of Anna (the district's administrative centre) by road. Stary Kurlak is the nearest rural locality.

References 

Rural localities in Anninsky District